Shih Shou-chien (born 8 June 1951) is a Taiwanese scholar, writer, and professor at National Taiwan University. He served as Director of National Palace Museum from May 2004 to January 2006. He is an academician of Academia Sinica.

Life and career
Shih Shou-chien was born in Taiwan on June 8, 1951. He graduated from National Taiwan University as well as Princeton University. He studied the Chinese art history under Wen Fong, a noted Chinese-American art historian. He was a professor at National Taiwan University in 1990, becoming director of the Institute of Art History in 1991. In May 2000 Executive Yuan appointed him as Deputy Director of the National Palace Museum. After this office was terminated in May 2004, he was promoted to Director position, serving until January 2006. He is a researcher at Academia Sinica since 2006, and he was elected an academician in July 2012.

References

1951 births
Living people
National Taiwan University alumni
Princeton University alumni
Taiwanese writers
Directors of National Palace Museum